Giancarlo Gentilini (born 3 August 1929 in Vittorio Veneto, Province of Treviso) has been Deputy Mayor and Mayor, of the city of Treviso, Italy.

Career
Gentilini has worked as director at the legal bureau of the Cassamarca until his retirement.
He has been mayor of Treviso for two consecutive administrations, from 1994 to 1998 and 1998 to 2003, with the party of the Northern League. 
In 2003, Paolo Gobbo was elected mayor; Gentilini became deputy mayor, as current legislation prevents mayors from serving more than two consecutive terms. Gentilini's support was decisive in the victory of Gobbo. Gentilini is a lawyer.

References

1929 births
Living people
People from Vittorio Veneto
Politicians of Veneto
Venetist politicians
Mayors of Treviso
Lega Nord politicians
21st-century Italian politicians